Matt Caughthran (born February 13, 1979) is an American singer, best known as the frontman for Los Angeles-based punk band The Bronx and Mariachi El Bronx. In addition to The Bronx, Caughthran is involved in a side project, The Drips. Caughthran has also recorded a number of tracks with Bullet Treatment which can be found on the What More Do You Want? EP and the full length The Mistake. He has also provided guest vocals for Biffy Clyro, Trash Talk, Oppenheimer, Every Time I Die and DZ Deathrays.

External links 
 
The Drips official band website

1979 births
Living people
American punk rock singers
The Bronx (band)
21st-century American singers
American punk rock musicians